The Mesta was a powerful association of sheep holders in the medieval Crown of Castile.

Mesta may also refer to:

Organizations
 Mesta (company), a Norwegian company primarily building roads
 Mesta Machinery, a former major US manufacturer of heavy machinery from 1898 until 1983

Places
 Mesta River, a river in Bulgaria and Greece
 Mesta, Greece, a village on the island of Chios, Greece
 Mesta, Bulgaria, a village in Bulgaria

Other uses
 Mesta station, a light rail station in Pittsburgh, Pennsylvania, United States
 Imset or Mesta, in Egyptian mythology, a funerary deity, one of the Four sons of Horus
 Roselle (plant) or Meśta, a species of hibiscus native to the Old World tropics, cultivated for the production for bast fibre
 Perle Mesta (1889–1975), American society figure, political hostess, and ambassador to Luxembourg

See also
 Óláfs saga Tryggvasonar en mesta, one of the kings' sagas